Rangers F.C. is an association football club from Glasgow.

Rangers F.C. may also refer to:
Association football
 FC Rànger's, Andorra
 Rangers de Talca, Chile
 Queens Park Rangers F.C., England
 Hong Kong Rangers FC
 Rangers A.F.C., New Zealand
 Enugu Rangers, Nigeria; officially Rangers International Football Club
 Rangers W.F.C., women's football team associated with Rangers F.C.
 Rangers F.C. (South Africa)

Other sports
 Rangers F.C. (Superleague Formula team), motor racing team associated with Rangers F.C.

See also
 List of association football clubs named Rangers
 Randers FC similarly spelled Danish football club
 Rangers (disambiguation)